Nick Lee Capra (born March 8, 1958) is an American professional baseball coach, most recently for the Chicago White Sox

Career
A former outfielder, Capra appeared in 45 MLB games over portions of five seasons for the Texas Rangers and Kansas City Royals, collecting nine total hits and one home run, a solo blow off Steve Baker of the Oakland Athletics on September 22, 1982. He attended Lamar Community College, Blinn College and the University of Oklahoma and was drafted by the Rangers in the third round of the 1979 amateur draft.

Capra made his professional debut with the Rangers' Double-A Tulsa Drillers affiliate in 1979. Over the course of a 17-season minor league baseball career, he batted .294 with 1,170 hits. He played his last season with the Florida Marlins' Triple-A Charlotte Knights in 1995.

Capra joined the White Sox' system in 1996 as a minor-league manager, working at all levels of the minors for 11 seasons (1996–2005; 2008). In 2006–07 he served Chicago as roving minor league hitting coordinator. Then from 2009 to 2011 he was the ChiSox' minor league field coordinator before becoming the club's director of player development for five seasons (2012–16). On October 14, 2016, he was named the third-base coach for the Chicago White Sox of Major League Baseball. His appointment to manager Rick Renteria's staff for 2017 marked his first assignment as a big-league coach, and his 22nd season in the White Sox organization. In 2019 Capra signed a new 2-year contract to remain as 3rd base coach. The White Sox let him go following the 2020 season.

He resides in Scottsdale, Arizona during the offseaon and frequents Oklahoma to hunt.

References

External links

1958 births
Living people
American expatriate baseball players in Canada
Baseball coaches from Colorado
Baseball players from Denver
Birmingham Barons managers
Blinn Buccaneers baseball players
Buffalo Bisons (minor league) players
Charlotte Knights players
Chicago White Sox coaches
Sportspeople from Denver
Denver Bears players
Edmonton Trappers players
Kansas City Royals players
Lamar Runnin' Lopes baseball players
Major League Baseball farm directors
Major League Baseball outfielders
Major League Baseball third base coaches
Nashville Sounds players
Oklahoma City 89ers players
Oklahoma Sooners baseball players
Omaha Royals players
Scranton/Wilkes-Barre Red Barons players
Texas Rangers players
Tulsa Drillers players
Wichita Aeros players